Wotao Yin is an applied mathematician and professor of Mathematics department at the University of California, Los Angeles in Los Angeles, California. He currently conducts research in optimization, parallel and distributed computing, and inverse problems.

Education

Wotao Yin received his PhD in operations research at Columbia University in 2006 under the supervision of Donald Goldfarb. His dissertation title was The TV-L1 Model Theory, Computation and Applications.

Awards and honours
In 2016, Wotao Yin was awarded the gold Morningside Gold Medal at the International Congress of Chinese Mathematicians, which is awarded to "outstanding mathematicians of Chinese descent to encourage them in their pursuit of mathematical truth". He was also awarded an NSF CAREER award in 2008, and was made an Alfred P. Sloan Fellow in 2009.

References

Living people
1979 births
Columbia School of Engineering and Applied Science alumni
Nanjing University alumni
Applied mathematicians
University of California, Los Angeles faculty
21st-century American mathematicians